The Peace Fountain is a sculpture and fountain in the Morningside Heights section of Manhattan in New York City. 

Peace Fountain may also refer to:
 Peace Fountain (Hiroshima), in Hiroshima Peace Memorial Park
 Charles Brooks Peace Fountain, in Coventry Gardens, aka Reaume Park, in Windsor, Ontario